Anroux Johanna Marais (née Du Toit; born 8 December 1956) is a South African politician of the Democratic Alliance (DA). She has been serving as the Western Cape Provincial Minister of Cultural Affairs and Sport since 2015. She has been a Member of the Western Cape Provincial Parliament since 2004.

Political career
Marais served as a City of Cape Town councillor from 2000 to 2004. She was elected to the Western Cape Provincial Parliament in 2004. Marais has since been re-elected three times: in 2009, 2014 and 2019.

Marais has been a member of various committees during her tenure in the Provincial Parliament. She served a full term on the Standing Committee on Cultural Affairs and Sport. She also served as Chairperson of both the Standing Committees on Health and Social Development.

In April 2015, incumbent Provincial Minister of Cultural Affairs and Sport, Theuns Botha, announced his retirement from the Western Cape Provincial Government. Premier Helen Zille appointed Marais as the new Provincial Minister, and she took office on 24 April 2015.

In May 2015, Marais was re-elected unopposed to a second term as chairperson of the Provincial Caucus of the Democratic Alliance.

In May 2019, newly elected Premier Alan Winde retained Marais as Provincial Minister of Cultural Affairs and Sport.

Personal life
Marais is married to DA Member of Parliament, Erik Marais.

References

Living people
Democratic Alliance (South Africa) politicians
Members of the Western Cape Provincial Parliament
Women members of provincial legislatures of South Africa
Afrikaner people
21st-century South African politicians
21st-century South African women politicians
1956 births